Eleazar Lipa Sukenik (12 August 1889, in Białystok – 28 February 1953, in Jerusalem) was an Israeli archaeologist and professor at the Hebrew University of Jerusalem. He is best known for helping establish the Department of Archaeology at the Hebrew University and being one of the first academics to recognise the age and importance of the Dead Sea Scrolls. He also oversaw the uncovering of the Third Wall of ancient Jerusalem. He also was the director of the Museum of Jewish Antiquities at the Hebrew University.

Personal life
Sukenik was born on August 12, 1889 in the town of Belostok, Grodno Governorate, Russian Empire (today Białystok in Poland). In 1912, he immigrated to Palestine where he worked as a school teacher and tour guide. He studied archaeology at the Hebrew Teachers Seminary in Jerusalem. He obtained a degree from the University of Berlin in 1923 and in 1926 his Doctorate from Dropsie College in Philadelphia, Pennsylvania.

He served in the British army in World War I in the 40th Battalion of the Royal Fusiliers, which became known as the Jewish Legion.

He was the father of General, politician and archaeologist Yigael Yadin, the actor Yossi Yadin (born Joseph Sukenik, 1920–2001), and Mati Sukenik, one of the first pilots of the Israeli Air Force, who was killed in action during the 1948 Arab-Israeli War.

Eleazar Sukenik was the brother of a pharmacist who lived in the United States, who in the 1950s was convicted for selling amphetamines without prescriptions and whose son, Herbert Sukenik, was a physicist who lived the second half of his life as a recluse in New York City.

Eleazar Sukenik and his wife, Chassia, were buried in the Sanhedria Cemetery near the Tombs of the Sanhedrin which he researched. Unlike the other graves in the cemetery, which are covered by uniform limestone blocks, the couple's gravestones are uniquely decorated with carvings and motifs of the Second Temple era. He was an atheist.

Career
In addition to his important excavations in Jerusalem (including the "Third Wall" and numerous ossuary tombs), he played a central role in the establishment of the Department of Archaeology of the Hebrew University. He recognized the importance of the Dead Sea Scrolls to the State of Israel and worked for the government to buy them. In 1948, he published an article tentatively linking the scrolls and their content to a community of Essenes, which became the standard interpretation of the origin of the scrolls, a theory that is still probably the consensus among scholars, but has also been widely questioned. In 1950, he received the Solomon Bublick Award of the Hebrew University of Jerusalem for this work.

Works
 Ancient Synagogues in Palestine and Greece (Schweich Lectures of the British Academy for 1930). London, 1934.
 The Third Wall of Jerusalem: An Account of Excavations. Jerusalem: University Press, 1930
 The Ancient Synagogue of Beth Alpha. An Account of the Excavations conducted on behalf of the Hebrew University, Jerusalem. Jerusalem: Oxford University Press: London, 1932.
 Samaria-Sebaste Reports of the Work of the Joint Expedition in 1931–1933, and of the British Expedition in 1935. London, 3 volumes 1938, 1942, 1957.

As editor
 The Dead Sea Scrolls of the Hebrew University. Magnes Press, Hebrew University: Jerusalem, 1955.

References

Further reading
  A book on an important synagogue mosaic discovered by Sukenik in 1928.

Israeli archaeologists
Jews in Ottoman Palestine
Jews in Mandatory Palestine
Israeli Jews
Polish emigrants to Israel
People from Białystok
Academic staff of the Hebrew University of Jerusalem
1889 births
1953 deaths
Solomon Bublick Award recipients
20th-century archaeologists
Israeli atheists
Jewish atheists